XHITZ-FM (Z90.3) is an English-language Top 40 (CHR) radio station in San Diego-Tijuana, broadcasting at 90.3 MHz. The station is owned by Comunicación XERSA, S.A. de C.V., a Mexican broadcast company. 49 percent of the concessionaire is owned by an American company, Local Media San Diego, which holds the right to use the frequency and programs the station from studios in the Sorrento Valley neighborhood of San Diego, along with two other Mexican FM stations broadcasting in English, Alternative Rock-formatted XETRA-FM and Rhythmic AC-formatted XHRM-FM. LMSD also wholly owns U.S.-licensed KFBG.

XHITZ-FM's 100,000–watt transmitter and antenna are on Mount San Antonio in Tijuana. Because of this, it must abide by all Mexican broadcast regulations, including mandatory public service announcements, political coverage, and the compulsory airings of La Hora Nacional ("The National Hour") on Sunday nights, and the Mexican National Anthem at midnight and 6:00 a.m. daily.

XHITZ also airs the Top 40/CHR version of "Sunday Night Slow Jams", which begins at 8:00 p.m.
It is one of two San Diego/Tijuana affiliates for the program, the other being sister station XHRM-FM, which carries the "Throwback" version.

History
In September 1970, the station signed on as XHIS-FM, more than three years before receiving its concession in November 1973. It was owned by Víctor Díaz, the founder of Califórmula Broadcasting, which would come to own and operate numerous stations in the San Diego-Tijuana radio market. However, it signed on with a brokered radio format from the United States. Time Sales, Inc., owned by radio automation pioneer Paul Schafer, and presented a jockless progressive rock format known as "HIS Radio". Time Sales added a second Mexican station when 100.1 XHERS-FM (now 104.5 XHLTN-FM), a soft rock station known as "HERS Radio", signed on in December, and a third, XHQS-FM 95.7 "OURS", was also planned. Aside from the music, HIS Radio featured parodies of commercials and a satirical radio novel, the O.B. Ranger. The operation was run by Larry Shushan, a former owner of KPRI FM radio and one of the builders of KAAR, San Diego's first UHF television station.

XHIS and XHERS broadcast from a new facility in Tijuana with custom-built 100,000–watt transmitters, throwing maximum power at San Diego.  These were the first border blasters on FM. Programming originated from Time Sales's studios and sales offices at the Royal Inn at the Wharf and was transported by cassette to the transmitter, as the Brinkley Act prevented a live hookup from being used.  Within six months, Time Sales had two of the top three stations in San Diego.

By 1973, however, the tides had turned for Time Sales. San Diego broadcasters complained of disloyal competition across the border that didn't have to play by the Federal Communications Commission's rules for radio stations and decried the promotion of XHIS and XHERS as "San Diego stations" not using the X in their call signs. The FCC opened an investigation into Time Sales, Schafer and Shushan, resulting in mounting legal fees. Ultimately, Time Sales folded, and Díaz began operating the station under the brand "Estéreo 90, La Buena Onda". By 1975, XHIS was broadcasting soul music and R&B.  Ironically, it was more popular with teens and women than with men.

A 1981 row between Califórmula and politically motivated broadcast workers temporarily forced Díaz out of the broadcasting business. In April, a report had aired on one of the Califórmula stations criticizing Baja California Governor Roberto de la Madrid. Just two weeks after returning to an R&B format, in September, workers affiliated to the Union of Radio and Television Industry Workers (STIRT) went on strike, and the only way to resolve the strike was to sell XHIS and XHERS to Francisco Aguirre, founder of Mexico City broadcaster Grupo Radio Centro. The Tijuana acquisition marked GRC's first ever expansion outside the capital city.

Two years later, Díaz bought back the cluster of XHIS and XHERS, instituting new call signs and formats on both. That year, XHIS became XHITZ-FM and changed to an album-oriented rock format under contract to San Diego Radio Company. However, in 1984, the station stumbled in an ownership dispute. A bitter battle between San Diego Radio Company and Califórmula led to the abrupt end of the album rock format as the latter took control of the station. Díaz cited continued low ratings, but the straw that broke the camel's back was a humorous news report read on the station that stated a German anthropologist had discovered a tribe of "mole people" living in the sewers of Mexico City. When the report was read in late June, it caught the attention of Mexican authorities, who were outraged over the secondhand account they had heard, which implied that Mexicans were so poor they lived in sewers.

In 1986, Díaz sold the American marketing rights for XHITZ again, this time to Broadcasting, Marketing and Management, Ltd. BMM ceased operation of the station on June 30, 1988 as it assigned the rights to another company, Consolidated Radio Sales, which was also bankrupt. The result was that Díaz and the head of Consolidated Radio Sales, Jack McCoy, clashed. In mid-July, McCoy fired all the employees in the U.S. and had all the locks changed, with several employees instead showing up to work in Tijuana. Later that day, however, a bankruptcy judge ruled that Díaz owned the U.S. operation of the stations.

In 1989, XHITZ flipped from adult contemporary to a rock-oriented hits format known as "Pirate Radio," based on the success of KQLZ in Los Angeles. On April 5, 1990, however, XHITZ switched to a Dance-leaning Rhythmic Top 40 format, under Program Director Rick Thomas. "Z90" competed against Q106, which was the powerhouse of Top 40 in the market. With Z90's debut, however, it took only a few books for XHITZ to beat Q106, and thanks to its success, it also forced the market's only Urban Contemporary outlet, future sister station XHRM-FM, out of that format by 1993. As Z90 remained on top, Q106 shifted towards a more Mainstream Top 40 format, and it wasn't until September 1996 that XHITZ would have another direct competitor against KHTS, which had a Dance lean, much like XHITZ.  Even though XHITZ served as the official callsign, it was marketed unofficially as "XHTZ" also due to the fact most TV and radio callsigns carry four letters.

However, by August 1998, XHITZ would move away from its Dance approach to begin focusing more on Hip-Hop/R&B. The station also rebranded as "Jammin' Z90" before reverting to "Z90.3". In 2002, Califórmula would wind down most of its operations as Díaz retired and then died.  The U.S. operating rights were sold to Clear Channel Communications (forerunner of today's iHeartMedia) and the concession was transferred to a new Mexican concern, Comunicación XERSA. XHITZ remained a hip-hop leader until 2004, when XHMORE-FM flipped to a hip hop-leaning Rhythmic Top 40. These two stations would battle until late 2009, when XHMORE changed formats. Shortly after this, XHITZ shifted back to its Dance-leaning and a more Mainstream direction. Despite being the market's only Rhythmic Top 40, XHITZ continued to share much of the same music as KHTS-FM and KEGY, all of whom are Rhythmic-leaning Top 40/CHRs (KEGY has since flipped to sports talk as KWFN), along with Adult Top 40 KMYI. On April 2, 2012, XHITZ rebranded from "Z90.3" to "Jammin' Z90." In mid-2014, XHITZ rebranded back to "Z90." Today, the station airs a CHR format, resulting in both Nielsen BDS and Mediabase moving XHITZ from the Rhythmic to Mainstream reporting panels in February 2015.

Ownership/management
Clear Channel controlled XHITZ and two other radio stations licensed to Mexico but programmed in English and aimed at the San Diego market, as well as owning five FM stations in San Diego as well.  A 2003 Federal Communications Commission ruling forced Clear Channel to divest the operating rights to its Mexican stations in order to remain under FCC ownership caps. On July 25, 2005, Clear Channel transferred the programming and local marketing arrangements of XHITZ, along with XETRA-FM and XHRM-FM, to Finest City Broadcasting, a new company under the direction of former Clear Channel/San Diego VP/Market Manager Mike Glickenhaus. Finest City took over operations on December 1, 2005.

In 2009, these programming and marketing rights were sold to Broadcast Corporation of the Americas after Finest City defaulted on assets that resulted in its bankruptcy. In 2010, BCA would spin off XHITZ, XETRA and XHRM to Local Media of America after a change in management.

On October 6, 2015, Midwest Television (owners of 760 KFMB and 100.7 KFMB-FM) announced that it had entered into a joint operating agreement with Local Media San Diego LLC, forming an entity known as SDLocal to manage their collective cluster of stations. The intent of this agreement was to "[preserve the] local ownership and operation of San Diego's top-rated radio stations". The agreement ended at the end of 2016. Local Media San Diego eventually acquired KFMB and KFMB-FM outright from Tegna, Inc. on March 17, 2020, with KFMB (AM) being concurrently divested to iHeartMedia; Tegna had purchased Midwest Television's stations in 2018.

References

External links 
 
Investigation of radio operations in Tijuana, MX conducted by broadcast engineer Donald Mussell
Finest City Broadcasting (former owners of XHITZ)

https://web.archive.org/web/20100317020028/http://www.yes.com:80/#KSCF?log#XHITZ

Contemporary hit radio stations in Mexico
Radio stations in Tijuana
Radio stations established in 1970
1970 establishments in Mexico